Video Core Next is AMD's brand for its dedicated video encoding and decoding hardware core. It is a family of hardware accelerator designs for encoding and decoding video, and is built into AMD's GPUs and APUs since AMD Raven Ridge, released January 2018.

Background
Video Core Next is AMD's successor to both the Unified Video Decoder and Video Coding Engine designs, which are hardware accelerators for video decoding and encoding, respectively. It can be used to decode, encode and transcode ("sync") video streams, for example, a DVD or Blu-ray Disc to a format appropriate to, for example, a smartphone. Unlike video encoding on a CPU or a general-purpose GPU, Video Core Next is a dedicated hardware core on the processor die. This application-specific integrated circuit (ASIC) allows for more power-efficient video processing.

Support
Video Core Next supports: MPEG-2 Decode, MPEG-4 Decode, VC-1 Decode, H.264/MPEG-4 AVC Encode/Decode, HEVC Encode/Decode, and VP9 Decode.

VCN 2.0 is implemented with Navi products and the Renoir APU. The feature set remains the same as VCN 1.0.
VCN 3.0 is implemented with Navi 2 products.

See also

Video hardware technologies

Nvidia 

 PureVideo - Nvidia
 GeForce 256's Motion Compensation
 High-Definition Video Processor
 Video Processing Engine
Nvidia NVENC
Nvidia NVDEC

AMD 

 Video Core Next - AMD
 Video Coding Engine - AMD
 Unified Video Decoder - AMD
 Video Shader - ATI

Intel 

 Quick Sync Video - Intel
 Clear Video - Intel
Qualcomm

 Qualcomm Hexagon

References

Video acceleration
AMD IP cores
Video compression and decompression ASIC